The 2021 FIBA Under-16 Women's Americas Championship was an international basketball competition held in León, Guanajuato, Mexico from 23 to 29 August 2021. It was the seventh edition of the FIBA Under-16 Women's Americas Championship. The top four teams qualified for the 2022 FIBA Under-17 Women's Basketball World Cup in Hungary.

Qualification

Eight teams from three sub zones were qualified through the Nike Youth Ranking for each sub-zone.

Draw
The draw ceremony for the competition took place on 10 August at the FIBA Regional Office, in the city of Miami, Florida.

Group phase

All times are local (UTC−5).

Group A

Group B

Knockout stage

Bracket

Quarterfinals

5-8th place seminfinals

Seminfinals

Seventh place game

Fifth place game

Third place game

Final

Final ranking

Statistical leaders

Players

Points

Rebounds

Assists

Steals

Blocks

Other statistical leaders

Awards

 Most Valuable Player: 
  JuJu Watkins
 All-Star Five:
  JuJu Watkins
  Jada Williams
  Cassandre Prosper
  Loriette Maciel
  Taissa Nascimento Queiroz

See also
 2021 FIBA Under-16 Americas Championship
 2022 FIBA Under-17 Women's Basketball World Cup

References

FIBA Americas Under-16 Championship for Women
2021 in women's basketball
2021–22 in North American basketball
International women's basketball competitions hosted by Mexico
FIBA
August 2021 sports events in Mexico